A wooden horse, Chevalet (as it was called in Spain), Spanish donkey or cavaletto squarciapalle, is a torture device,  of which there exist two variations; both inflict pain by using the subject's own weight by keeping the legs open, tied with ropes from above, while lowering down the subject. The French called this instrument the chevalet, from the French diminutive of cheval, horse.

Torture device

The first variation of the wooden horse is a triangular device with one end of the triangle pointing upward, mounted on a sawhorse-like support. The victim is made to straddle the triangular "horse." Weights or additional restraints were often added to keep the victim from falling off. A punishment similar to this called "riding the rail" was used during the American colonial period and later. The victim was often carried through town in this predicament, often in conjunction with the punishment of tarring and feathering. The crotch could be injured and the victim left unable to walk without pain.

The Jesuit Relations say that in 1646, a man "was sentenced to make reparation, by the Civil authority, and to mount the Chevalet," and "a public blasphemer, was put on the Chevalet. He acknowledged his fault, saying that he had well deserved punishment, and came of his own accord to confess, that evening or the next day," and that another man "acted at the fort as such a glutton, that he was put on the Chevalet, on which he was ruptured."

The device was used during the American Civil War by Union guards against their Confederate prisoners:

 The History Channel documentary Eighty Acres of Hell describes a torture device, "the mule", on which Confederate prisoners were forced to ride until they passed out; many were crippled for life. 

The device was also used by Union officers as an entertaining way to discipline troops, and on freedmen and women after the Civil War.

References

External links

European instruments of torture
Medieval instruments of torture